is a Japanese sprinter specialising in the 400 metres. He has won several medals with the Japanese 4 × 400 metres relay team.

His personal best in the 400 metres is 45.52 seconds set in Niigata in 2015.

Competition record

References

1996 births
Living people
Japanese male sprinters
Olympic male sprinters
Olympic athletes of Japan
Athletes (track and field) at the 2016 Summer Olympics
Universiade medalists in athletics (track and field)
Universiade silver medalists for Japan
Competitors at the 2017 Summer Universiade
Medalists at the 2015 Summer Universiade
World Athletics Championships athletes for Japan
Japan Championships in Athletics winners
20th-century Japanese people
21st-century Japanese people